William F. Faber (January 3, 1858 – April 8, 1951) was an American building contractor and politician.

Born in Oshkosh, Wisconsin, Faber was educated in the public schools. He was a building contractor and owned a stone quarry. In 1888, Faber served on the Oshkosh Common Council and was a Democrat. In 1891, Faber served in the Wisconsin State Assembly. Faber died at his home in Oshkosh, Wisconsin.

Notes

External links

1858 births
1951 deaths
Politicians from Oshkosh, Wisconsin
Businesspeople from Wisconsin
Wisconsin city council members
Democratic Party members of the Wisconsin State Assembly